Estadio Municipal 25 de Abril is a multi-use stadium in Penafiel, Portugal. It is primarily used for football matches and is the home ground of F.C. Penafiel.

The ground currently holds a capacity of 5,300. The stadium was built between 1930 and 1934 and was opened on 21 January 1934. The first game it hosted was between Penafiel and Penafidelense. The stadium was previously called Campo das Leiras but was changed in 1974 following the Carnation Revolution. The stadium was remodeled in 2000.

References

External links
 Profile at ZeroZero
 Profile at ForaDeJogo

Municipal 25 de Abril
Sports venues in Porto District
Buildings and structures in Penafiel
Sports venues completed in 1934
1934 establishments in Portugal